"Magnet and Steel" is a hit single written and performed by Walter Egan, released in March 1978.  It was the first and biggest hit on Egan's second solo LP, Not Shy.  It reached number eight on the U.S. Billboard Hot 100 and number nine in Canada.  It spent 22 weeks on the American charts.

Stevie Nicks and Lindsey Buckingham, members of Fleetwood Mac, sang background vocals along with several others; Buckingham was also one of the song's producers, along with Egan and Richard Dashut.  Nicks was also Egan's inspiration for the song.

Later uses
"Magnet and Steel" was featured in Boogie Nights (1997), Overnight Delivery (1998), and Deuce Bigalow: Male Gigolo (1999).  It was also heard in the Season 2 episode "Ohio" of the HBO series Divorce (2018) and in the film This is 40.

The singer Matthew Sweet did a version of the song for the Sabrina the Teenage Witch album with Lindsey Buckingham on guitar.

Personnel
Walter Egan – lead vocals, guitar
Lindsey Buckingham – guitars, background vocals
Stevie Nicks, Annie McLoone  – background vocals
 John Selk – bass guitar, background vocals
 Tom Moncrieff – guitar, background vocals
 Stephen Hague – keyboards, vocals
 Mike Hurt – drums, percussion

Chart performance

Weekly charts

Year-end charts

See also
 List of 1970s one-hit wonders in the United States

References

External links
 Listen to "Magnet and Steel" (Audio).

1978 singles
1978 songs
Columbia Records singles
Polydor Records singles
Songs written by Walter Egan
Song recordings produced by Richard Dashut
American soft rock songs
Stevie Nicks songs
Lindsey Buckingham songs